Wyoming is an unincorporated community in Wyoming County, West Virginia, United States. It gets its name from the counties name. Wyoming sits along the Guyandotte River. Wyoming has a post office and a Methodist church.

Notable person
Wyoming is home to former NFL running back Curt Warner, who played for the Seattle Seahawks and the Los Angeles Rams.

References

Unincorporated communities in West Virginia
Unincorporated communities in Wyoming County, West Virginia
Populated places on the Guyandotte River